Chillán River is a river in Ñuble Region in the southern portion of Central Chile.

Rivers of Ñuble Region
Rivers of Chile
es:Río Chillán